Magnum Opus is the eighth studio album by guitarist Yngwie Malmsteen, released on 17 October 1995. The album reached No. 11 and 17 on the Finnish and Swedish albums chart respectively.

Critical reception

Steve Huey at AllMusic gave Magnum Opus three stars out of five, calling it a "predictable mix of generic hard rockers, sugary ballads, and Malmsteen's trademark neo-classical guitar instrumentals." He said the album had nothing new to offer, but nonetheless recommended it for diehard Malmsteen fans.

Track listing

 – Renamed "Tournament" on 2003 reissue

Personnel
Yngwie Malmsteen – guitar, sitar, background vocals, production
Michael Vescera – lead vocals
Mats Olausson – keyboard
Shane Gaalaas – drums
Barry Sparks – bass
Chris Tsangarides – engineering, mixing, production
Keith Rose – engineering assistance

Release history

Chart performance

Certifications and sales

References

External links
Magnum Opus, 1995 at yngwiemalmsteen.com
In Review: Yngwie J. Malmsteen "Magnum Opus" at Guitar Nine Records

Yngwie Malmsteen albums
1995 albums
Music for Nations albums
Pony Canyon albums
SPV/Steamhammer albums
Albums produced by Chris Tsangarides